Naasan Ajjoub (born 3 September 1960) is a Syrian boxer. He competed at the 1980 Summer Olympics and the 1984 Summer Olympics. At the 1980 Summer Olympics, he lost to Petar Stoimenov of Bulgaria.

References

External links

1960 births
Living people
Syrian male boxers
Olympic boxers of Syria
Boxers at the 1980 Summer Olympics
Boxers at the 1984 Summer Olympics
Place of birth missing (living people)
Heavyweight boxers
20th-century Syrian people